Yangjeong Station is a station of Busan Metro Line 1 in Yangjeong-dong, Busanjin District, Busan, South Korea.

Station Layout

External links

  Cyber station information from Busan Transportation Corporation

Busan Metro stations
Busanjin District
Railway stations in South Korea opened in 1985